Stoyanka Dimitrova Krastenova is a Bulgarian former politician.

Biography

Early life and education 
Krastenova was born 11 May 1935 in Pazardzhik, Kingdom of Bulgaria. She graduated from a polytechnic institute in Leningrad as a mechanical engineer in 1959. She was a teacher at the Mathematical High School Konstantin Velichkov from 1963 to 1967.

Political career 
She was a member of the Bulgarian Communist Party since 1962. She was mayor of Pazardzhik from 1971 to 1973. During this period, in her first term, 7 residential blocks with 392 apartments were built. In her second term, also 7 with 336 apartments. Enterprises for agronomic services with modernly furnished warehouses were established. Four summer bases were built - Prevala, Kurtludzha, Muhuvo and Dobra Voda. At the 14th Extraordinary Congress of the Communist Party of Bulgaria in January 1990, she was elected to the party's Supreme Council.

References 

Bulgarian politicians
Bulgarian politician stubs
1935 births